Altoparadisium is a genus of bunchgrass plants in the grass family. The species are native to Brazil and Bolivia in South America.

Species
Species include:
 Altoparadisium chapadense Filg., Davidse, Zuloaga & Morrone — Brazil.
 Altoparadisium scabrum (Pilg. & Kuhlm.) Filg., Davidse, Zuloaga & Morrone — Brazil, Bolivia.

See also
 List of Poaceae genera

References

Panicoideae
Poaceae genera